"Loyalty" (stylized as "LOYALTY.") is a song by American rapper Kendrick Lamar featuring Barbadian singer Rihanna from the former's fourth studio album Damn, released on April 14, 2017. The song was later sent to urban and rhythmic radio June 20, 2017, as the second single from the album. The sixth track on the album (ninth on the Collector's Edition of Damn), The song was written by the artists alongside producers DJ Dahi, Sounwave, Terrace Martin, and Anthony "Top Dawg" Tiffith. The song won the Grammy Award for Best Rap/Sung Performance.

Composition
The song contains a reverse sample of "24K Magic" produced by Shampoo Press & Curl and The Stereotypes, and performed by American singer Bruno Mars.

Critical reception
Complex calls it a "standout track" and one of Damns most "radio-friendly cuts". The Fader writer Jason Parham calls "Loyalty", "anxious, berserk, and beautifully intransigent in [its] own right" and "equal parts pop, funk, and brooding rap hymnal". Frank Guan of Vulture enjoyed the song, especially Rihanna's part, saying "though only eight bars, Rihanna's sung rap is as fluent as it is brief, a swift and casual tour of her accomplishments." Rap-Up called the song a "standout track that allows Kung Fu Kenny and Bad Gal RiRi to address allegiance from a variety of angles."

Awards and nominations

Music video
The music video for the song was released to Lamar's Vevo channel on YouTube on July 28, 2017. It was directed by Dave Meyers and The Little Homies and includes an appearance from featured artist Rihanna. Jordan Darville of The Fader gave the music video a positive review, praising the visuals and called Lamar and Rihanna's adventure together "carefully crafted [and] suitably amorous."

Live performances
Lamar has performed "Loyalty" on the Damn tour.

Credits and personnel 

Kendrick Duckworth – songwriter
Rihanna – vocals, songwriter
Dacoury Natche – songwriter, producer, additional vocals
Byron "Mr. Talkbox" Chambers – additional vocals
Mark Spears – songwriter, producer
Terrace Martin – songwriter, producer
Anthony "Topdawg" Tiffith – songwriter, producer
Bruno Mars – songwriter
Philip Lawrence – songwriter
Christopher Brody Brown – songwriter
Ol' Dirty Bastard – songwriter
RZA – songwriter
Jay-Z – songwriter
Memphis Bleek – songwriter
Snoop Dogg – songwriter
Rick Rock – songwriter
Bēkon – additional production and vocals
Kid Capri – additional vocals
Derek Ali – mixing
Tyler Page – mix assistant
Jamal Owens - Master mixer

Charts

Weekly charts

Year-end charts

Certifications

Release history

References

2017 songs
Kendrick Lamar songs
Rihanna songs
Songs written by Kendrick Lamar
Songs written by Terrace Martin
Music videos directed by Dave Meyers (director)
2017 singles
Songs written by DJ Dahi
Songs written by Sounwave
Grammy Award for Best Rap/Sung Collaboration
Interscope Records singles
Songs about loyalty